Western Australia is the second largest country subdivision in the world. Ninety-eight of these are National Parks, totalling  (2.14% of the state’s area).

Protected areas of Western Australia

Conservation Parks

Blackbutt
Boyagarring		
 Brooking Gorge	
Burra
Camp Creek
Cane River
Coalseam	
Dardanup
Devonian Reef	
Geikie Gorge	
Goldfields Woodlands
 Gooralong	
Hester
Kerr
Korijekup
Lane Poole
Laterite
Len Howard
Leschenault Peninsula
Leschenaultia	
Lupton	
Monte Bello Islands	
Mount Manning - Helena And Aurora Ranges
Muja
Penguin Island
Rapids
Rowles Lagoon	
Shell Beach	
Totadgin
Unnamed WA01333
Unnamed WA17804
Unnamed WA23088
Unnamed WA23920
Unnamed WA24657
Unnamed WA28740
Unnamed WA29901
Unnamed WA38749
Unnamed WA39584
Unnamed WA39752
Unnamed WA41986
Unnamed WA43290
Unnamed WA46756
Unnamed WA47244
Unnamed WA48291
Unnamed WA48436
Unnamed WA48717
Unnamed WA49144
Unnamed WA49220
Unnamed WA49363
Unnamed WA49561
Unnamed WA49742
Unnamed WA49994
Unnamed WA51272
Unnamed WA51376
Wallaroo Rock
Westralia
Wunaamin Miliwundi Ranges
Yarra Yarra Lake

Marine Nature Reserves

 Hamelin Pool

Marine Parks

 Bremer
 Jurien Bay
 Marmion
 Montebello Islands
 Ngari Capes
 Ningaloo
 North Kimberley
 Rowley Shoals
 Shark Bay
 Shoalwater Islands
 Swan Estuary

Miscellaneous Reserves

 Bundegi
 Jurabi
 Monkey Mia
 Woodvale

National Parks

Overview
Western Australia has had national parks or protected areas under legislation since the early 20th century. National Parks (and the earlier forms of reserve) in Western Australia came under a range of agencies: 
 Department of Lands and Surveys: 1 January 1890 - (partly split) 31 December 1895
 Wood and Forests Department: 1 January 1896 – 31 December 1918
 Forests Department: 1 January 1919 – 21 March 1985
 State Gardens Board:    15 December 1920 – 30 April 1957  (Parks and Reserves Act 1895)
 National Parks Board:    1 May 1957 – 30 July 1977
 Department of Fisheries and Fauna: 1 October 1964 – 31 December 1973
 National Parks Authority:       1 August 1977 – 15 April 1985 
 The National Parks and Nature Conservation Authority replaced the National Parks Authority in 16 April 1985 ceased 30 October 2000. Then to the Conservation Commission.
 Wildlife section of the Department of Fisheries and Wildlife: 1 January 1974 – 21 March 1985 
 Department of Environment: 1 July 2004 - 30 June 2006
 Department of Conservation and Land Management (CALM):     22 March 1985 – 30 June 2006  (Conservation and Land Management Act 1984)
 Department of Parks and Wildlife (2006 to 2017 ?)
 The Department of Biodiversity, Conservation and Attractions was created on 1 July 2017

List

 Alexander Morrison
 Avon Valley
 Badgingarra
 Beelu (formerly Mundaring)
 Blackwood River
 Boorabbin
 Boorara-Gardner
 Boyndaminup
 Bramley
 Brockman
 Cape Arid
 Cape Le Grand
 Cape Range
 Collier Range
 Dalgarup
 Danggu Gorge (formerly Geikie Gorge)
 D’Entrecasteaux
 Dirk Hartog Island
 Drovers Cave
 Drysdale River
 Easter
 Edel Land
 Eucla
 Fitzgerald River
 Forest Grove
 Francois Peron
 Frank Hann
 Gloucester
 Goldfields Woodlands
 Goongarrie
 Gooseberry Hill
 Greater Beedelup (formerly Beedelup)
 Greater Dordagup
 Greater Hawke
 Greater Kingston
 Greater Preston
 Greenmount
 Gull Rock
 Hassell
 Helena
 Hilliger
 Jane
 John Forrest
 Kalamunda
 Kalbarri
 Karijini
 Karlamilyi (formerly Rudall River)
 Kennedy Range (formerly Pickering Brook)
 Korung
 Lake Muir
 Lawley River
 Leeuwin-Naturaliste
 Lesmurdie Falls
 Lesueur
 Midgegooroo (formerly Canning)
 Millstream Chichester
 Milyeannup
 Mirima (formerly Hidden Valley)
 Mitchell River
 Moore River
 Mount Augustus
 Mount Frankland
 Mount Frankland North
 Mount Frankland South
 Mount Lindesay
 Mount Roe
 Murujuga
 Nambung
 Neerabup
 Peak Charles
 Porongurup
Prince Regent
 Purnululu
 Scott
 Serpentine
 Shannon
 Sir James Mitchell
 Stirling Range
 Stokes
 Tathra
 Torndirrup
 Tuart Forest
 Tunnel Creek
 Walpole-Nornalup
 Walyunga
 Wandoo
 Warren
 Watheroo
 Waychinicup
 Wellington
 West Cape Howe
 Whicher
 William Bay
 Wiltshire-Butler
 Windjana Gorge
 Wolfe Creek Meteorite Crater
 Yalgorup
 Yanchep
 Yelverton

Nature Reserves
. 
 Airlie Island
 Alco
 Alexander
 Alfred Cove
 Amery
 Anderson Lake
 Arpenteur
 Arthur River
 Austin Bay
 Badjaling
 Bakers Junction
 Baladjie Lake
 Bald Island
 Balicup Lake
 Balkuling
 Ballanup Lake
 Ballast Pit
 Bampanup
 Banksia Road
 Barbalin
 Barlee Range
 Barrabarra
 Barracca
 Barrow Island
 Bartletts Well
 Bartram
 Bashford
 Basil Road
 Beagle Islands
 Beaumont
 Bebenorin
 Bedout Island
 Beebeegnying
 Beechina
 Beechina North
 Beejenup
 Beekeepers
 Beetalyinna
 Bella Vista
 Bendering
 Benger Swamp
 Bernier And Dorre Islands
 Betts
 Bewmalling
 Biglin
 Biljahnie Rock
 Billericay
 Billyacatting Hill
 Binaronca
 Bindoo Hill
 Bindoon Spring
 Birdwhistle
 Birdwood
 Bishops
 Blue Gum Creek
 Blue Rock Cave
 Blue Well
 Bobakine
 Bockaring
 Bokan
 Bokarup
 Bon Accord Road
 Boodadong
 Boodalan
 Boodie, Double And Middle Islands
 Boolading
 Boolanelling
 Boonadgin
 Boonanarring
 Booraan
 Boothendarra
 Boullanger, Whitlock, Etc Islands
 Boundain
 Bowgada
 Bowgarder
 Boyagin
 Boyermucking
 Bradford
 Breakaway Ridge
 Breaksea Island
 Broadwater
 Brooks
 Brookton Highway
 Broomehill
 Browse Island
 Bruce Rock
 Buchanan
 Bugin
 Bulgin
 Buller
 Buller, Whittell And Green Islands
 Bullsbrook
 Bundarra
 Bungulla
 Buntine
 Burdett
 Burdett North
 Burdett South
 Burges Spring
 Burgess Well
 Burma Road
 Burnside And Simpson Islands
 Burracoppin
 Burroloo Well
 Bushfire Rock
 Byrd Swamp
 Cairlocup
 Cairn
 Calcaling
 Camel Lake
 Camerer
 Canna
 Capamauro
 Capel
 Capercup Road North
 Cardunia Rocks
 Cardup
 Carlyarn
 Carmody
 Carnac Island
 Caron
 Carrabin
 Carribin Rock
 Carrolup
 Cartamulligan Well
 Cascade
 Casuarina
 Cervantes Islands
 Chandala
 Charles Gardner
 Charlie Island
 Chatham Island
 Cheadanup
 Cherry Tree Pool
 Cheyne Road
 Chiddarcooping
 Chilimony
 Chillinup
 Chinamans Pool
 Chinocup
 Chirelillup
 Chittering Lakes
 Chorkerup
 Clackline
 Claypit
 Clear And Muddy Lakes
 Clyde Hill
 Cobertup
 Coblinine
 Commodine
 Concaring
 Condarnin Rock
 Cookinbin
 Coolinup
 Coomallo
 Coomelberrup
 Cootayerup
 Copley Dale
 Corackerup
 Corneecup
 Coulomb Point
 Cowerup
 Coyrecup
 Craig
 Crampton
 Creery Island
 Cronin
 Crooks
 Culbin
 Cullen
 Cutubury
 Dalyup
 Damboring
 Damnosa
 Dangin
 Danjinning
 Dattening
 De La Poer Range
 Dead Mans Swamp
 Depot Hill
 Derdibin Rock
 Dingerlin
 Dingo Rock
 Dingo Well
 Dolphin Island
 Dongara
 Dongolocking
 Donnelly River
 Donnybrook Boyup Brook Road
 Dookanooka
 Doubtful Islands
 Doutha Soak
 Dowak
 Down Road
 Dragon Rocks
 Dragon Tree Soak
 Drummond
 Dukin
 Duladgin
 Dulbelling
 Dulbining
 Dumbleyung Lake
 Dundas
 Dunn Rock
 Durokoppin
 East Collanilling
 East Latham
 East Naemup
 East Nugadong
 East Wallambin
 East Yorkrakine
 East Yornaning
 East Yuna
 Eastbrook
 Eaton
 Elashgin
 Ellen Brook
 Elliot
 Elphin
 Emu Hill
 Eneminga
 Eradu
 Erangy Spring
 Essex Rocks
 Falls Brook
 Faunadale
 Fields
 Fisherman Islands
 Flagstaff
 Flat Rock Gully
 Flat Rock
 Flinders Bay
 Flowery Patch
 Folly
 Formby
 Forrestdale Lake
 Fourteen Mile Brook
 Fowler Gully
 Freycinet, Double, Etc Islands
 Friday Island
 Frog Rock
 Gabbin
 Gabwotting
 Galamup
 Galena
 Gathercole
 Geekabee Hill
 Geeraning
 Gibson Desert
 Gillingarra
 Gingilup Swamps
 Gingin Stock Route
 Glasse Island
 Gledhow
 Glenluce
 Gnandaroo Island
 Gnarkaryelling
 Goodenough
 Goodlands
 Gorge Rock
 Granite Hill
 Great Sandy Island
 Great Victoria Desert
 Greaves Road
 Green Island
 Griffiths
 Gum Link Road
 Gundaring Lake
 Gundaring
 Gunyidi
 Haag
 Haddleton
 Haddleton Springs
 Hamelin Island
 Harris
 Harrismith
 Harry Waring
 Harvey Flats
 Hayes
 Heathland
 Herndermuning
 Highbury
 Highbury West
 Hill River
 Hillman
 Hindmarsh
 Hines Hill
 Hobart Road
 Holland Rocks
 Hopkins
 Horne
 Hotham River
 Howatharra
 Hurdle Creek
 Ibis Lake
 Indarra Spring
 Inkpen Road
 Investigator Island
 Jackson
 Jaloran
 Jam Hill
 Jandabup
 Jebarjup
 Jeffrey Lagoon
 Jerdacuttup Lakes
 Jibberding
 Jilbadji
 Jingalup
 Jingaring
 Jitarning
 Johns Well
 Jouerdine
 Jura
 Kadathinni
 Kalgan Plains
 Kambalda
 Karamarra
 Karlgarin
 Karloning
 Karnet
 Karroun Hill
 Kathleen
 Kau Rock
 Keaginine
 Kendall Road
 King Rock
 Kirwan
 Kockatea
 Kodj Kodjin
 Kodjinup
 Kokerbin
 Koks Island
 Kondinin Lake
 Kondinin Salt Marsh
 Koodjee
 Koolanooka Dam
 Koolanooka
 Koolberrin
 Kooljerrenup
 Koornong
 Korbel
 Korrelocking
 Kuender
 Kulikup
 Kulin Road
 Kulunilup
 Kulyaling
 Kundip
 Kurrawang
 Kwolyin
 Kwolyinine
 Kwornicup
 Lacepede Islands
 Lake Ace
 Lake Barnes Road
 Lake Biddy
 Lake Bryde
 Lake Campion
 Lake Cronin
 Lake Dumbleyung
 Lake Eyrie
 Lake Gounter
 Lake Hinds
 Lake Hurlstone
 Lake Janet
 Lake Joondalup
 Lake King
 Lake Liddelow
 Lake Logue
 Lake Magenta
 Lake McLarty
 Lake Mealup
 Lake Mears
 Lake Mortijinup
 Lake Muir
 Lake Ninan
 Lake Pleasant View
 Lake Powell
 Lake Shaster
 Lake Varley
 Lake Wannamal
 Lake Warden
 Lakeland
 Lambkin
 Lancelin And Edward Islands
 Landscape Hill
 Latham
 Lavender
 Leda
 Lipfert, Milligan, Etc Islands
 Little Rocky Island
 Locke
 Locker Island
 Lockhart
 Long Creek
 Long Pool
 Low Rocks
 Lowendal
 Mailalup
 Mallee
 Mallee Plain
 Malyalling
 Manaling
 Mangkili Claypan
 Manmanning Dam
 Manmanning
 Manning Road
 Maragoonda
 Marbelup
 Marchagee
 Marindo
 Marrarup
 Martinjinni
 Martinup
 Maublarling
 Maughan
 Maya
 McDougall
 McGlinn
 McIntosh Road
 McLarty
 McLean Road
 Mealup Point
 Meelon
 Meenaar
 Mehinup
 Merewana
 Merredin
 Mettabinup
 Mettler Lake
 Michaelmas Island
 Mill Brook
 Milyu
 Mingenew
 Mininup
 Minniging
 Minnivale
 Minyulo
 Miripin
 Mistaken Island
 Mitchell River Bridge
 Mockerdungulling
 Modong
 Moganmoganing
 Mogumber
 Mogumber West
 Mokami
 Mokine
 Mollerin
 Mongelup
 Moochamulla
 Moojebing
 Moomagul
 Moondyne
 Moonijin
 Mooradung
 Mooranoppin
 Moore River
 Moornaming
 Moorumbine
 Morangarel
 Morangup
 Mordalup
 Mordette
 Mortlock
 Morton
 Moulien
 Mount Burdett
 Mount Byroomanning
 Mount Caroline
 Mount Hampton
 Mount Manning
 Mount Manypeaks
 Mount Mason
 Mount Ney
 Mount Nunn
 Mount Pleasant
 Mount Ridley
 Mount Shadforth
 Mount Stirling
 Mournucking
 Mullet Lake
 Mungaroona Range
 Mungarri
 Mungerungcutting
 Munglinup
 Muntz
 Murapin
 Murnanying
 Nabaroo
 Nallian
 Namban
 Namelcatchem
 Namming
 Nanamoolan
 Nangeen Hill
 Nangeenan
 Napier
 Napping
 Narlingup
 Neale Junction
 Needham
 Needilup
 Neendojer Rock
 Neerabup
 Nembudding
 Nembudding South
 Neredup
 Niagara Dam
 Niblick
 Nilgen
 Nilligarri
 Nine Mile Lake
 Nonalling
 Noobijup
 Noombling
 Noonebin
 Noonying
 Noorajin Soak
 Norpa
 North Baandee
 North Beacon
 North Bonnie Rock
 North Bungulla
 North Dandalup
 North Jitarning
 North Karlgarin
 North Sister
 North Tammin
 North Tarin Rock
 North Turtle Island
 North Wagin
 North Wallambin
 North Woyerling
 North Yilliminning
 Nugadong
 Nukarni
 Nuytsland
 Oakabella
 Oakajee
 Ockley
 Old Store
 One Mile Rocks
 One Tree Point
 Ongerup Lagoon
 Orchid
 Ord River
 Outer Rocks
 Overheu
 Overshot Hill
 Owingup
 Pallarup
 Pallinup
 Pantapin
 Paperbark
 Pardelup
 Pardelup Road
 Parkerville
 Parkeyerring
 Parry Lagoons
 Pederah
 Pelican Island
 Peringillup
 Petercarring
 Phillips Brook
 Piara
 Pikaring
 Pikaring West
 Pindicup
 Pingaring
 Pingeculling
 Pingelly
 Pinjarrega
 Pintharuka
 Pintharuka Well
 Pinticup
 Plain Hills
 Plumridge Lakes
 Point Spring
 Poison Gully
 Pootenup
 Powlalup
 Protheroe
 Quagering
 Quairading Spring
 Quarram
 Queen Victoria Spring
 Quindinup
 Quins Hill
 Quongunnerunding
 Randell Road
 Recherche Archipelago Nature Reserve
 Red Hill
 Red Lake
 Red Lake Townsite
 Redmond Road
 Rica Erickson
 Ridley North
 Ridley South
 Rifle Range
 Riverdale
 Roach
 Rock Hole Dam
 Rock View
 Rocky Island
 Roe
 Rogers
 Ronsard Rocks
 Rose Road
 Rosedale
 Round Island
 Ruabon Townsite
 Rudyard Beach
 Rugged Hills
 Sabina
 Saint Alouarn Island
 Salt Lake
 Sand Spring Well
 Sandford Rocks
 Sandland Islands
 Sawyers
 Scotsdale Road
 Scott Reef
 Scriveners
 Seagroatt
 Seal Island
 Serrurier Island
 Sevenmile Well
 Shackleton
 Shark Lake
 Sheepwash Creek
 Shelter Island
 Shoalwater Bay Islands
 Silver Wattle Hill
 Six Mile Road
 Ski Lake
 Sleeman Creek
 Sloss
 Smith Brook
 Snake Gully
 Sorensens
 South Buniche
 South Eneabba
 South Jingalup
 South Keunder
 South Kulin
 South Mimegarra
 South Sister
 South Stirling
 South Wilgoyne
 Southern Beekeeper's
 Sparks Road
 Speddingup East
 Springdale
 St Ronans
 Stinton Cascades
 Stockdill Road
 Strange Road
 Strathmore Hill
 Stretton Road
 Sugar Loaf Rock
 Swan Island
 Swan Lagoon
 Sweetman
 Taarblin Lake
 Takenup Road
 Tammin Railway Dam
 Tank Hill
 Tapper Road
 Tarin Rock
 Tennessee North
 Tent Island
 Tenterden
 The Forty Four Mile
 The Tubbs
 Thevenard Island
 Thomsons Lake
 Three Swamps
 Throssell
 Tinkelelup
 Toolibin
 Toolonga
 Toompup
 Tootanellup
 Towerrining
 Trigwell
 Truslove North
 Truslove Townsite
 Tutanning
 Twin Swamps
 Two Peoples Bay
 Twongkup
 Twyata
 Udamung
 Ulva
 Unicup
 Unnamed (298 different areas)
 Urawa
 Utcha Well
 Victor Island
 Victoria Rock
 Wagin Lake
 Wahkinup
 Walbarra
 Walbyring
 Walcancobbing
 Walk Walkin
 Wallaby Hills
 Wallambin
 Walyahmoning
 Walyormouring
 Wamballup
 Wambyn
 Wamenusking
 Wanagarren
 Wandana
 Wandi
 Wandjagill
 Wandoora
 Wangeling Gully
 Wanjarri
 Wansbrough
 Wardering Lake
 Warramuggan
 Warranine
 Warrawah
 Warrenup
 Wattening
 Weam
 Wedge Island
 Wedgengully
 Weelhamby Lake
 Weira
 Weirmonger
 Weld Island
 Wellard
 Welsh
 West Mount Mason
 West Perenjori
 Westmere
 Whalebone Island
 Whin Bin Rock
 Whistler
 White Gums
 White Lake
 Whitmore, Roberts, Doole Islands And Sandalwood Landing
 Wialkutting
 Wild Horse Swamp
 Wilga
 Wilgarup
 Williams
 Willoughby
 Wills
 Wilroy
 Wilson
 Wingedyne
 Wockallarry
 Wokatherra
 Wongamine
 Wongan Hills
 Wongonderrah
 Wongoondy
 Woodanilling
 Woody Island
 Woody Lake
 Woondowing
 Woorgabup
 Woottating
 Wotto
 Woyerling
 Wulyaling
 Wundowlin
 Wyalkatchem
 Wyening
 Wyola
 Wyvern Road
 Xantippe
 Y Island
 Yallatup
 Yandinilling
 Yanneymooning
 Yardanogo
 Yarding
 Yarnup
 Yarra Yarra
 Yeal
 Yelbeni
 Yellerup
 Yellowdine
 Yenyening Lakes
 Yeo Lake
 Yilgerin
 Yilliminning
 Yorkrakine Rock
 Yornaning
 Yurine Swamp
 Zuytdorp

Regional parks

 Banyowla
 Beeliar
 Canning River
 Chapman River
 Herdsman Lake
 Jandakot
 Meelup
 Mundy
 Rockingham Lakes
 Usher-Dalyellup
 Woodman Point
 Wooroloo
 Wungong
 Yellagonga

Section 5(1)(g) Reserves
Under the CALM Act, land designated as 5(1)(g) Reserve is land vested in the Conservation and Parks Commission of Western Australia that is not a National Park, Conservation Park, Nature Reserve, Marine Park or Marine Nature Reserve. Such land may have a wide variety of purposes, but are normally related to recreation, wildlife conservation, infrastructure and historical features.
 Bullock Holes Timber Reserve
 Coonana Timber Reserve
 Emu Rocks Timber Reserve
 Kangaroo Hills Timber Reserve
 Keanes Point Reserve
 Lakeside Timber Reserve
 Lane Poole Reserve
 Matilda Bay Reserve
 Monadnocks Section 5(1)(g) Reserve
 Purnululu Conservation Reserve
 Sandalwood Block Timber Reserve
 Scahill Timber Reserve
 Sedimentary Deposits Reserve
 Stockyard Gully Reserve
 Wallaby Rocks Timber Reserve
 Unnamed Section 5(1)(g) Reserves (30 different areas)

Indigenous Protected Areas
Indigenous Protected Areas in Western Australia include:

 Balanggarra Indigenous Protected Area
 Bardi Jawi Indigenous Protected Area
 Birriliburu Indigenous Protected Area
 Dambimangari Indigenous Protected Area
 Karajarri Indigenous Protected Area
 Kiwirrkurra Indigenous Protected Area
 Matuwa and Kurrara-Kurrara Indigenous Protected Area
 Ngaanyatjarra Indigenous Protected Area
 Ngadju Indigenous Protected Area
 Ngururrpa Indigenous Protected Area
 Ninghan Indigenous Protected Area
 Nyangumarta Warrarn Indigenous Protected Area
 Paruku Indigenous Protected Area
 Uunguu Indigenous Protected Area
 Warlu Jilajaa Jumu Indigenous Protected Area
 Wilinggin Indigenous Protected Area
 Yawuru Indigenous Protected Area

See also
 Geography of Western Australia
 Protected areas of Australia

References

Further reading

External links
Parks and Wildlife Service

 
Western Australia
Protected areas
 
Conservation parks of Western Australia